Shreerampur  is a Village under Bhomra Union of Satkhira Sadar Upazila of Satkhira District in the division of Khulna, Bangladesh.

The Shreerampur is a   traditional and largest village in Bhomra Union in Satkhira Sadar upazila of Satkhira district of Satkhira district, the white golden district of South Bengal of Bangladesh.

References 

Villages in Satkhira District